Astrosaurs is a series of children's science fiction novels written by Steve Cole, which have been released since 2005. The main characters are space-going dinosaurs named Teggs Stegosaur (a Stegosaurus), Gipsy Saurine (a Corythosaurus), Arx Orano (a Triceratops) and Iggy Tooth (an Iguanodon). The series are published by Random House. The first two Astrosaurs books were released on 1 February 2005, with over twenty books following.  The Teeth of the T. Rex was a special edition book written especially for World Book Day. Free trading cards come with each Astrosaur book, featuring foes, weapons, crew members, ships, aliens and many other characters and things found in the relevant book, with a set of 'bonus cards' available to order from the Steve Cole website, which are now believed to have gone out of print, and featured characters from the first eight books. The World Book Day title The Teeth of the T. Rex does not include cards, and is much shorter than the other books. The first five Astrosaurs books have now been released in Audiobook format on CD in the UK. The series is a huge hit with children nationwide. Beginning in late 2010, the books have been re-released with new cover artwork. Currently, books 12–15 are the only ones not to have been given the new covers. Woody Fox is the illustrator on every Astrosaurs book, who also draws the illustrations for the trading cards, with Charlie Fawkes having designed the Astrosaurs logo, consisting of the word 'ASTROSAURS' with the four main characters above it.

Synopsis 
The broad plot synopsis of the Astrosaurs series is that the dinosaurs were not in fact wiped out when a large meteor hit the earth millions of years ago; they had in fact discovered space travel during the Triassic period and had already left earth by the time the meteor struck. The dinosaurs subsequently settled in a part of space called the Jurassic Quadrant, which is divided between the carnivores and herbivores; between the two sectors is a neutral area of space. The two factions broadly stay at peace by avoiding each other, but invariably trouble flares up between the two from time to time. Admiral Rosso, a 'crusty old Barosaurus''', employs Teggs to work for the DSS (Dinosaur Space Service) in the first book and introduces him to his crew, which includes Arx Orano, Iggy Tooth and Gipsy Saurine, along with fifty Dimorphodon. In Earth Attack, which is notable for being an extra-long edition, General Loki the Velociraptor goes back in time to try and prevent the dinosaurs leaving Earth, so the whole history of Astrosaurs would never have happened. However, he is stopped.

 Characters 

 Books in the series 

 Astrosaurs Academy 
A spin-off series of Astrosaurs started on 1 May 2008. This series focuses on Teggs Stegosaur in Astrosaurs Academy, it is based before Teggs becomes an Astrosaur. In Astrosaurs Academy, Teggs has two best friends, Blink and Dutch. Gipsy, Arx and Iggy do not appear in this series. The series ended with Space Kidnap on 3 March 2011.Destination: Danger: Published – 1 May 2008Contest Carnage: Published – 1 May 2008Terror Underground: Published – 4 September 2008Jungle Horror: Published – 5 February 2009Deadly Drama: Published – 2 July 2009Christmas Crisis: Published – 1 October 2009Volcano Invaders: Published – 1 April 2010Space Kidnap'': Published – 3 March 2011

Reception 
Amanda Craig, writing in the Times, described it as "the kind of inspired, hysterically silly fantasy that boys adore".

References

External links 
 Official Astrosaurs web site
 Steve Cole Audio Interview: Cows, Dinosaurs and Doctor Who

Juvenile series
British children's novels
Series of children's books
Children's science fiction novels
Children's novels about dinosaurs
Novels set on fictional planets